Josiah Terry Everest (October 5, 1800 in Addison, Vermont – September 1, 1873) was an American lawyer and politician active in New York. He served on the New York State Assembly as the representative for Clinton County.

Life
He was the son of Joseph Everest (1754–1825) and Sarah (Eells) Everest (1755–1835). The family removed to Peru, New York in 1801. On June 3, 1821, he married Sarah ("Sallie") Sibley (1806–1883), and they had eleven children.

He was a Judge of the Clinton County Court in 1845.

He was a Whig member of the New York State Assembly (Clinton Co.)  in 1855.

He was an Inspector of State Prisons from 1859 to 1861, elected on the Republican ticket in 1858.

Sources
The New York Civil List compiled by Franklin Benjamin Hough, Stephen C. Hutchins and Edgar Albert Werner (1867; pages 411 and 479)
STATE NOMINATIONS in NYT on November 6, 1854
 Everest genealogy, at RootsWeb

1800 births
1873 deaths
19th-century American politicians
Members of the New York State Assembly
New York State Prison Inspectors
New York (state) Republicans
New York (state) Whigs
People from Addison, Vermont
People from Peru, New York